Jørgen Kolstad (born 31 August 1995) is a Norwegian football midfielder who plays for Eidsvold Turn.

References

1995 births
Living people
People from Aurskog-Høland
Norwegian footballers
Lillestrøm SK players
Kongsvinger IL Toppfotball players
Eidsvold TF players
Eliteserien players
Norwegian First Division players
Association football midfielders
Sportspeople from Viken (county)